Gazuiyeh Cheshmeh Khandali (also Romanized as Gazū’īyeh Cheshmeh Khandalī; also known as Gazū’īyeh) is a village in Qaleh Asgar Rural District, Lalehzar District, Bardsir County, Kerman Province, Iran. At the 2006 census, its population was 65, in 14 families.

References 

Populated places in Bardsir County